Filamer Christian University (FCU) is a private Baptist Christian university located in Roxas, Capiz. It is affiliated with the Convention of Philippine Baptist Churches.

History
The university has its origins in the founding of Capiz Home School in 1904 by Rev. and Mrs. Joseph Robbins with the help of the American Baptist Foreign Mission Society.  In 1952, it took the name of Filamer Christian Institute and Filamer Christian College in 1985. It became a university in 2010.

School seal
The Outer Circle Official Seal of Filamer Christian University represents the programs and services that Filamer offers. The Inner Circle symbolizes the development of the individual's well-rounded personality. The Equilateral Triangle inside the circle stands for the three balanced components of human potentialities: the spiritual, the intellectual, and the physical with the spiritual aspect as the base. The Cross represents the victorious Christ as the center. The symbol emphasizes the love of God. The Sun represents the illuminating light and eternal hope for every person who searched for truth and wisdom. The number 1904 stands for the year the school was founded.

References

External links

http://www.filamer.edu.ph/ - Main website
http://filamerian.comule.com/ - Community Board
https://web.archive.org/web/20130120053319/http://fcu-massmedia.com/ - Mass Media Affairs

Education in Roxas, Capiz
Educational institutions established in 1904
Universities and colleges in Capiz
Association of Christian Universities and Colleges in Asia
Baptist universities and colleges in the Philippines
1904 establishments in the Philippines